Robert Cole (born 27 November 1938) is a former English cricketer.  Cole was a right-handed batsman who fielded as a wicket-keeper.  He was born in Ferryhill Station, County Durham.

Cole made his debut for Durham against the Lancashire Second XI in the 1958 Minor Counties Championship.  He played Minor counties cricket for Durham from 1958 to 1974, making 118 Minor Counties Championship appearances.  He made his List A debut against Hertfordshire in the 1964 Gillette Cup.  He made 6 further List A appearances, the last of which came against Essex in the 1973 Gillette Cup.  In his 7 List A matches, he scored just a single run.  Batting at number 11, he had 3 further batting innings in which he remained not out without scoring.  Behind the stumps he took 8 catches.

References

External links
Bob Cole at ESPNcricinfo
Bob Cole at CricketArchive

1938 births
Living people
People from Ferryhill
Cricketers from County Durham
English cricketers
Durham cricketers
Wicket-keepers